The 1981–82 Cypriot Cup was the 40th edition of the Cypriot Cup. A total of 42 clubs entered the competition. It began on 31 March 1982 with the preliminary round and concluded on 5 June 1982 with the replay final which was held at Makario Stadium. Omonia won their 6th Cypriot Cup trophy after beating Apollon 4–1 in the final.

Format 
In the 1981–82 Cypriot Cup, participated all the teams of the Cypriot First Division, the Cypriot Second Division and the Cypriot Third Division.

The competition consisted of six knock-out rounds. In all rounds each tie was played as a single leg and was held at the home ground of the one of the two teams, according to the draw results. Each tie winner was qualifying to the next round. If a match was drawn, extra time was following. If extra time was drawn, there was a replay at the ground of the team who were away for the first game. If the rematch was also drawn, then extra time was following and if the match remained drawn after extra time the winner was decided by penalty shoot-out.

The cup winner secured a place in the 1982–83 European Cup Winners' Cup.

Preliminary round 
In the first preliminary draw, participated all the 14 teams of the Cypriot Third Division and 6 of the 14 teams of the Cypriot Second Division (last six of the league table of each group at the day of the draw).

First round 
14 clubs from the Cypriot First Division and the rest clubs from the Cypriot Second Division met the winners of the preliminary round ties:

Second round

Quarter-finals

Semi-finals

Final 

Because the match ended in a draw after the extra time, a replay match was played.

Sources

See also 
 Cypriot Cup
 1981–82 Cypriot First Division

Cypriot Cup seasons
1981–82 domestic association football cups
1981–82 in Cypriot football